Cape Breton was a federal electoral district in Nova Scotia, Canada, that was represented in the House of Commons of Canada from 1867 to 1904. It was created as part of the British North America Act, 1867.

The district consisted of the county of Cape Breton and initially returned one member, but returned two members from 1872 until its dissolution. It was abolished when it was redistributed into Cape Breton South and North Cape Breton and Victoria ridings in 1903.

Geography

The Cape Breton riding was set by the British North America Act, 1867 to consist of Cape Breton County. The county was legally defined in 1852 as:
"all that part of the late county of Cape Breton to the southward of a line commencing at the entrance of a large stream that falls into the sea, about three miles to the westward of Point Ancomi, at the eastern extremity of the Island of Boularderie, and following the middle of the stream upwards, until it intersects the present highway between the great and little Bras d'Or; thence running parallel to the rear line of the front lot, on the north side of Boularderie, until it comes to the southwestern corner of the Reverend James Fraser's lot, on the north side thence south twenty degrees east, to the southeastern shore of Boularderie, and to continue on the same course to the middle of the Bras d'Or lake thence up the middle thereof westerly, to the middle of the strait of Barra thence following the mid channel thereof to the western end of the Strait thence in a direct line to the line at or near Point Malagawactchkt that separates the county of Cape Breton from the County of Inverness."

The boundaries were not changed during the 1872 electoral redistribution, but now the riding would return two members to Parliament. No changes occurred during the electoral redistributions of 1882 or 1892. This riding was dissolved and redistributed into the ridings of Cape Breton South and North Cape Breton and Victoria in the 1903 electoral redistribution.

Members of Parliament

Election results

See also 

 List of Canadian federal electoral districts
 Past Canadian electoral districts

Notes

References

External links 
Riding history for Cape Breton (1867–1903) from the Library of Parliament

Former federal electoral districts of Nova Scotia
Politics of the Cape Breton Regional Municipality